Thomas or Tom Egan may refer to:

 Thomas Egan (gangster) (1874–1919), St. Louis politician and organized crime figure
 Thomas Egan (cricketer) (1906–1979), Australian cricketer
 Thomas C. Egan (1894–1961), United States federal judge
 Tom Egan (born 1946), former professional baseball player
 Thomas W. Egan (1836–1887), American Civil War general
 Thomas Egan (physician) (1752–1818), Irish physician
 Thomas Selby Egan (1814–1893), first cox to win the Boat Race for Cambridge University
 a movie character